The Reisszug (also spelt Reißzug or Reiszug) is a private cable railway providing goods access to the Hohensalzburg Castle at Salzburg in Austria. It is notable for its extreme age, as it is believed to date back to either 1495 or 1504.

The Reisszug should not be confused with the Festungsbahn, a funicular that provides public access to the Hohensalzburg Castle, and which dates from 1892.

History

The line was first documented in 1515 by Matthäus Cardinal Lang, who would later become Archbishop of Salzburg. These dates would make it the oldest cable railway still in existence, and possibly the oldest existing railway. It has been claimed as the oldest funicular railway, although in the absence of evidence that it ever used a counterweight, this is debatable.

The Reisszug still traces its original route through the castle's fortifications. It starts from the grounds of the Nonnberg Abbey, below the eastern walls of the castle. It then rises up at a gradient of 65% to the central courtyard of the fortress, on its way passing through five concentric defensive walls. At the point where the line passes through each wall is a gateway, each of which can be closed by a sturdy wooden door. The presence and obvious age of the gateways serves to confirm Cardinal Lang's description of the line.

The line may have originally used sled-style runners, but wooden rails and wheels were soon adopted. Haulage was accomplished by a hemp rope. Until 1910 the line was operated by human or animal power. Over the years the line has been modified and rebuilt several times, most recently between 1988 and 1990. Today it uses steel rails and a steel cable. Traction is provided by an electric motor, and a closed circuit television system is used to monitor its operation.

Technical parameters

In its current incarnation, the line has the following technical parameters:

See also
Salzburg S-Bahn

References

External links

 Funimag article on the Reiszug

Rail transport in Salzburg
Railway lines in Austria
Funicular railways in Austria
1300 mm gauge railways in Austria